Solute carrier family 8 (sodium/lithium/calcium exchanger), member B1 is a protein that in humans is encoded by the SLC8B1 gene.

Function 

SLC24A6 belongs to a family of Potassium-dependent sodium-calcium exchangers that maintain cellular calcium homeostasis through the electrogenic countertransport of 4 sodium ions for 1 calcium ion and 1 potassium ion.

References

Further reading 

 
 
 

Genes
Human proteins